This is a list of all Turkish actors.

A 

Ahmet Mümtaz Taylan
Ahu Türkpençe
Ali Düşenkalkar
Ali Ersan Duru
Ali Şen
Alp Kırşan
Altan Erkekli
Alp Navruz
Aras Bulut İynemli
Arda Kural
Ata Demirer
Atıf Yılmaz
Ayhan Işık
Aykut Oray
Aytaç Arman
Alperen Duymaz
Aslı Enver
Aslıhan Güner
Aleyna Solaker

B 

Burak Çelik
Burak Dakak 
Burak Özçivit
Burak Deniz
Burak Sevinç
Burak Sergen
Barış Bağcı
Burcu Biricik
Burcu Kıratlı
Başak Köklükaya
Begüm Kütük
Bergüzar Korel
Beren Saat
Berrak Tüzünataç
Beyazıt Öztürk
Binnur Kaya
Birol Ünel
Bülent Çetinaslan
Bülent Oran
Buğra Gülsoy
Burcu Özberk
Berk Atan
Barış Arduç
Boran Kuzum
Birand Tunca
Berkay Ateş
Beren Gökyıldız
Berk Oktay
Bade İşçil

C 

Celal Al
Cahide Sonku
Caner Cindoruk
Cansel Elçin
Cansu Dere
Cem Yılmaz
Cemal Hünal
Cengiz Küçükayvaz
Cengiz Coşkun
Ceyda Ateş
Coşkun Göğen
Cüneyt Arkın
Canan Ergüder
Ceren Moray
Ceyda Düvenci

Ç 
Çağla Kubat
Çetin Tekindor
Çolpan İlhan
Çağatay Ulusoy
Çağrı Şensoy
Çağlar Ertuğrul

D 

Damla Sönmez
Demet Akbağ
Demet Evgar
Demet Özdemir
Deniz Çakır
Derya Alabora
Didem Erol
Didem Balçın
Dolunay Soysert
Deniz Baysal

E 

Ece Çeşmioğlu
Ezgi Mola
Eda Özerkan
Eda Ece
Ediz Hun
Ekrem Bora
Ekin Koç
Elçin Sangu
Esra Bilgiç
Erkan Avcı
Edip Tepeli 
Engin Altan Düzyatan
Engin Günaydın
Emre Kıvılcım
Ercan Yazgan
Erdal Beşikçioğlu
Erdal Özyağcılar
Eren Vurdem
Erkan Kolçak Köstendil
Erkan Can
Erol Keskin
Erol Günaydın
Erol Taş
Esin Varan
Eşref Kolçak
Ezel Akay
Ezgi Asaroğlu
Engin Akyürek
Esra Kızıldoğan
Ebru Şahin
Ege Kökenli

F 

Fahriye Evcen
Fatma Girik
Ferhan Şensoy	
Feri Cansel
Fikret Hakan
Fikret Kuşkan
Filiz Akın
Funda Eryiğit
Furkan Andıç
Filiz Taçbaş
Farah Zeynep Abdullah

G 

Gamze Özçelik
Gazanfer Özcan
Genco Erkal
Gökhan Alkan
Göksel Arsoy
Gökçe Bahadır
Gül Gölge
Gülse Birsel
Gülşen Bubikoğlu
Güven Hokna
Güven Kıraç
Gizem Karaca
Gupse Özay

H 

Hazal Filiz Küçükköse
Hazal Kaya
Hazal Türesan
Hande Erçel
Haldun Boysan
Haldun Dormen	
Hale Soygazi
Halit Akçatepe	
Halit Ergenç
Halil Ergün
Haluk Bilginer	
Haluk Piyes
Hande Ataizi
Hatice Aslan
Hayati Hamzaoğlu
Hazal Kaya
Hulusi Kentmen
Hülya Koçyiğit
Hümeyra Akbay
Hüseyin Köroğlu
Hande Doğandemir
Hazal Subaşı

I 
Itır Esen

İ 

İdil Fırat	
İhsan Yüce
İlker Aksum
İsmail Hacıoğlu
İzzet Günay
İbrahim Çelikkol
İlayda Alişan
İlayda Akdoğan
İpek Yaylacıoğlu
İrem Helvacıoğlu
İrem Sak

K 

Kadir İnanır
Kemal Sunal
Kenan Çoban
Kaan Taşaner
Kenan İmirzalıoğlu
Kerem Bürsin
Kıvanç Tatlıtuğ
Kaan Urgancıoğlu

L 
Lale Oraloğlu
Levent Kazak
Levent Üzümcü
Leyla Feray

M 

Melis Sezen
Mehmet Aslantuğ
Mehmet Günsür
Mehmet Özgür
Melih Ekener	
Melis Birkan
Meltem Cumbul
Melisa Aslı Pamuk
Melisa Döngel
Melisa Sözen
Melisa Şenolsun
Memduh Ün
Mert Öcal
Mert Firat
Mert Yazıcıoğlu
Merve Boluğur
Merve Sevi
Meryem Uzerli
Metin Akpınar
Mine Teber
Murat Yıldırım
Musa Uzunlar
Muzaffer Tema
Müjde Ar
Mümtaz Sevinç
Münir Özkul
Murat Aygen

N 

Nurettin Sönmez                  
Neslihan Atagül
Nesrin Cavadzade
Neslihan Yeldan
Nergis Öztürk
Nazan Kesal

O 
Okan Yalabık
Oktay Kaynarca
Olgun Şimşek
Ozan Güven
Onur Tuna
Orhan Aydın (1947)
Orhan Aydın (1961)

Ö 

Öner Erkan
Özge Gürel
Özge Özberk
Özge Özder 
Özge Törer
Özgü Namal
Özgür Çevik
Özlem Conker 
Öznur Serçeler
Öztürk Serengil

P 
Peker Açıkalın
Pelin Akil
Pelin Karahan
Perran Kutman
Pınar Deniz

R 
Rasim Öztekin

S 

Sadri Alışık
Salih Güney
Sanem Çelik
Savaş Dinçel
Sarp Akkaya
Sarp Levendoğlu
Sedef Avcı
Seçkin Özdemir
Selin Demiratar
Selma Ergeç
Serdar Gökhan
Serenay Sarıkaya
Serhan Yavaş
Serhat Tutumluer
Serhat Kılıç
Sevda Dalgıç
Sevinç Erbulak
Selim Bayraktar
Sıtkı Akçatepe
Sinan Albayrak
Sinan Tuzcu
Sinem Kobal
Songül Öden
Sümer Tilmaç
Sinem Ünsal

Ş 
Şafak Sezer
Şahan Gökbakar
Şebnem Dönmez
Şebnem Sönmez
Şenay Gürler
Şener Şen
Şerif Sezer

T 

Tamer Karadağlı
Tamer Yiğit
Taner Birsel
Tardu Flordun
Tarık Akan
Timuçin Esen
Tolga Çevik
Tolga Sarıtaş
Tolgahan Sayışman
Tuba Ünsal
Turgay Tanülkü
Turgut Özatay
Türkan Şoray
Tuba Büyüküstün

U 
Uraz Kaygılaroğlu
Uğur Polat
Uğur Yücel
Ulaş Tuna Astepe
Uğur Güneş
Uğur Pektaş

Ü 
Ümit Erdim

V 

Vildan Atasever
Vahide Perçin

Y 

Yaman Okay
Yaprak Özdemiroğlu
Yasemin Kozanoğlu
Yavuz Turgul
Yelda Reynaud
Yeşim Büber
Yetkin Dikinciler
Yıldız Kenter
Yılmaz Erdoğan
Yılmaz Güney
Yiğit Özşener
Yurdaer Okur
Yeşim Ceren Bozoğlu
Yasemin Allen

Z 
Zeki Alasya
Zeynep Değirmencioğlu
Zerrin Tekindor
Zeynep Çamcı

References

Turkey

Actors